Newry Cathedral or the Cathedral of Saint Patrick and Saint Colman is a Roman Catholic cathedral located in Newry, Northern Ireland. It acts as the seat of the Bishop of Dromore, and the Mother church of the Roman Catholic Diocese of Dromore.  Prior to the COVID-19 pandemic, over 200,000 people visited the cathedral each year.

Brief History
The See of Dromore was founded in the sixth century by Colman of Dromore, and has had its own independent jurisdiction ever since. The old cathedral of Dromore, which had been taken by the Protestants, was burnt down by the Irish insurgents in 1641 and rebuilt by Bishop Taylor twenty years later; the Catholic Church was erected later. In 1750 the seat of the cathedral was transferred to Newry, the largest town of County Down, situated at the head of Carlingford Lough.

Newry Cathedral, dedicated under the joint patronage of St Patrick & St Colman, was designed by the city's greatest native architect Thomas Duff; work began in 1825, with the basic building completed in 1829.  Built of local granite, it was the first Catholic cathedral in Ireland opened after Catholic Emancipation.

Work continued to enlarge and beautify the cathedral at various stages in the late nineteenth and early twentieth centuries: the tower and transept were added in 1888 and the nave was extended in 1904 under the supervision of Bishop Henry O'Neill.

It is a Grade A listed building.

The cathedral replaced St Mary's Church (the Old Chapel), which had been constructed by Bishop Lennan in 1789 and which, for forty years, doubled as both a parish church and quasi-cathedral, two bishops having received episcopal consecration there.

The stately Gothic Cathedral of SS. Patrick and Colman graces Newry’s Main Street. Though less imposing outwardly than other Irish cathedrals, many admit that the interior decoration of the cathedral is second to none in Ireland.

Foundation stone 
Details of the actual ceremony for the laying of the foundation stone are lacking. The Newry Telegraph records the fact that Bishop O’Kelly performed the ceremony on 8 June 1825.
Under his successor, Dr. Thomas Kelly, work on the cathedral continued. Within four years, the fabric of the church was completed, and the dedication ceremony was performed by the Primate, Dr. Curtis, on 6 May 1829 at 12 O'Clock. The dedication sermon was preached by Dr. Doyle, Bishop of Kildare and Leighlin. A contemporary writer referred to the ceremony as "the greatest attendance of Bishops and clergy seen for three centuries in the north of Ireland."

The Bishop's of the province dressed in Pontificals, walked in procession from the Sacristy to the Great West Door. After the Dedication ceremonies were concluded Solemn High Mass was offered. A collection was taken up by several Noblemen and Gentlemen to help defray the building costs. The sum of the collection was £141, 2s. 8d. The inside of the Cathedral was unfinished at the time of the Dedication. The galleries were also unfinished. Admission to the service was regulated by tickets at 5s. each. Upon opening the Cathedral was known as the Cathedral Church of St. Patrick. Locally it was known as the "New Chapel."

Second Phase of the building, 1888 - 1890 
The second phase of the building works was undertaken between the years 1888 - 1890. shortly after the appointment of Dr. Thomas McGivern as Co-adjustor under Bishop Pius Leahy. The arrival of a Papal Envoy suggested to Bishop Leahy that his Cathedral Church was not in keeping with the dignity of the diocese; as a response Bishop Leahy initiated the Second Phase of the building work under the direction of Bishop McGivern. The structural extensions carried out came to a cost of over £12,000. In 1888 the two transepts were added, the south transept being smaller than the north transept due to the mill in what is now the Cathedral garden. In 1890 the Great Bell Tower was completed and a new sacristy was erected. In 1891 a new High Altar was erected in the sanctuary in memory of Bishop Leahy. Despite the tower being completed in 1890 the peal of joy bells was not installed until 1898; along with the toll bell which had previously been on a temporary structure behind the church. The Joy-Bells were installed through the bequest of Rev. Bernard McAleenan, Parish Priest of Tullylish.

Third Phase of the building 1904 - 1909 

The third phase of building works was carried out under the direction of Bishop Henry O'Neill, who was Bishop of Dromore from 1901 - 1915. Monsignor Campbell a future administrator of the Cathedral Parish states, "it is to the refined taste and noble ideals of Bishop O'Neill, perhaps more than anyone else, that the proportions and grandeur of the Cathedral, as we know it today, are due." the architectural firm for the third scheme was Ashlin and Coleman of Dublin. Denis Neary who at the time was Newry's leading contractor was appointed contractor.

The third phase of the scheme involved extending the body of the Cathedral 40 feet towards Hill Street and approximately 30 towards Lower Water Street. The entire original facade of the cathedral was demolished and rebuilt in its original form following the extension of the nave of the church. The Sacristy which had been built behind the original Sanctuary, was removed and rebuilt as originally designed, to the North-East corner where it currently stands. The new sanctuary was panelled in marble and divided off from the side chapels by carved rood screens in Carrara Marble. Five new stained glass windows, the work of Hardman of Manchester, were erected around the rear of the Sanctuary. The entire walls of the church from floor to ceiling, the sanctuary floor, the floors of the side-chapels and the passages of the nave, were covered in richly coloured mosaics. When Dr. O'Neill undertook his work there were many who considered his plans rather ambitious given the financial constraints of Diocesan coffers. However, sufficient funds kept coming which gave encouraging hope and work progressed smoothly.

Generous sums of money was raised by the parish and diocese, a number of priests were appointed to travel further afield to other parts of Ireland, England, Scotland and the United States of America.     

The mosaic work was carried out by Oppenheimer of Manchester. The Cathedral contains the largest quantity of gold leafed mosaic in Ireland. The sections of mosaic were put together in a workshop and were glued, face downwards, on strips of parchment. These were applied to the walls in a similar manner to hanging wallpaper.

A new tubular triple manual organ was built by Telford and Telford in Dublin. A new heating system, seating and other general church furnishings were added during this time.

Two years after the completion of this work Dr. O'Neill purchased the spacious grounds to the south of the Cathedral where a mill once stood; which was destroyed in a fire which threatened the Cathedral.

Cathedral Dignity 1919 - Solemn Consecration 1925 
The great sums collected by Dr. O'Neill did not liquidate the cost of the reconstruction work. Though £30,000 had been raised, a heavy debt still remained. This debt was cleared in 1918 by the Most Reverend Edward Mulhern two years after his appointment to the See of Dromore. Though usually designated as a Cathedral, the premier Church of the Diocese ranked canonically only as a pro-cathedral, with Saint Patrick as its only Titular.

At the instance of Bishop Edward Mulhern, the Holy See, by a decree of the Sacred Congregation of Rites, dated 7 March 1919, raised the present church to the rank and dignity of a Cathedral. By the same decree the name of St. Colman, Patron of the Diocese, was added to that of St. Patrick as joint Titular aeque principalis.

The Cathedral of SS Patrick & Colman is one of the few church's in Ireland to be privileged with Solemn Consecration. With all debts cleared and the purchase of ground rents secured, Bishop Mulhern solemnly consecrated the building on Tuesday, 21 July 1925 - just one hundred years after the laying of its foundation stone. On the following Sunday impressive centenary ceremonies amid great jubilation marked the solemn occasion. At this function the Most Reverent Dr. Mulhern presided and over twenty Archbishops and Bishops were present including the Primate, Most Rev. Dr. O'Donnell, several Irish Bishops and also a number of foreign Bishops representative of five continents. The streets of Newry were tastefully bedecked with shrines, arches, bunting and papal flags for the occasion.

Cathedral Sanctuary 
The most imposing shrine in the Cathedral is the High Altar which commands the attention of all visitors. It is in gothic style with reredos gracefully turreted, it is mainly of Carrara and Statuary marble, relived by columns in Sienna and Verde Alpi with small panels in Porta Santa. The Tabernacle is enclosed by a handsomely - wrought golden doors beset with coloured jewels. In the reredos two fine marble panels are shown - a sculpture of the Nativity, and on the Gospel side and on the Epistle side a sculpture of Christ commissioning the Apostles. On either side of the altar is a marble seraph bearing a torch. On either side of the tabernacle is as adoring angel, presented by Bishop Mulhern. The Altar is decorated with candlesticks bearing enamel figures of the saints; a crucifix to match rests on a marble throne above the tabernacle and bears an ivory figure of Christ Crucified. 

The Main Sanctuary offers a splendid and fitting setting to the High Altar. the lower portion of the Sanctuary walls are panelled in marbles - Levanto Red, Porta Santa and Paonazzo - while the upper walls are finished in gold and richly coloured mosaics exhibiting a variety of emblematic symbols and a number of angelic figures. Handsomely carved screens in Carrara marble divide the main sanctuary from the two side chapels of the Blessed Virgin and St. Joseph. The large cluster of columns are of polished stone - Newry grey and Balmoral Red, these stones are Finnish imports. The coloured mosaic sanctuary floor, in floral design, carries in the centre infront of the High Altar the Coat of Arms of Bishop O'Neill. Overhead hangs the sanctuary lamp executed in Sterling Silver, a present from Mr & Mrs John J. McArevey, Newry.

Sacred Heart Shrine 
This notable shrine is enclosed by marble altar rails. It was erected by the Sacred Heart Confraternity in memory of Fr. James Carlin who was its Spiritual Director. Over the altar is a gilded shrine portraying Christ revealing the sorrows of his Sacred Heart to Saint Margaret Mary.

The altar is in Carrara marble with the reredos being Rosso Corallo with additions of Verde Serpentino and Sienna marble. Over the altar is a gilded shrine portraying Christ revealing the sorrows of His Sacred Heart to St. Margaret Mary. on either side of the reredos is a small panel depicting seraphim.

Above the altar the stain glass window, which was formerly in the centre of the sanctuary over the former High Altar was first erected in 1880 by the Holy Family Confraternity in memory of Fr. Pacificus C.P. the founder of the Confraternity. the window shows scenes on the life of the Holy Family, Our Lady, Jesus and Joseph at work. In the lower lights the Presentation in the Temple, Flight into Egypt and the Finding of Jesus in the Temple
On Tuesday 14 April 1925 at 10.00am Bishop Edward Mulhern Consecrated the Sacred Heart Shrine which was built into a niche in the North Transept.  It was the third altar to be consecrated in the Cathedral in preparation for the Consecration of the Cathedral itself in the summer of 1925. Fr Carlin in conjunction with the then Bishop of Dromore Dr. O'Neill planned the improvement scheme that has made the Cathedral one of the finest in Catholic Ireland. As part of the ceremony the Relics of Saints Prosper and Cyparius (which were brought by Bishop Mulhern from Rome) were brought in procession from the Lady Chapel Altar while the Office of Matins and Lauds from the Office of Martyrs was recited.

The Lady Chapel 
The Chapel of the Blessed Virgin is located to the left of the main Sanctuary displays the same ornate decoration in marbles and mosaics. A number of invocations from the Litany of the Blessed Virgin Mary, all worked in mosaics with accompanying symbols mainly in gold, are seen on the wall around the altar. The altar itself, in Carrara marble generally, carries columns in Sienna and Rosso Corallo, with small panels in Levanto Red. The tabernacle door has a gold finish and above stands a marble statue Our Lady of Lourdes. The two small panels in the marble reredos present the Annunciation and the Coronation of the Virgin. The stained glass window over the altar shows The Virgin Mary with the Child Jesus. The Virgin's parents, St. Joachim and St. Anne are shown in mosaics on either side. The sanctuary lamp in this chapel was presented by the Children on Mary Sodality, on the occasion of the Consecration in 1925. To the Left of the altar is a stained glass window showing Christ blessing the Little Children.

Saint Joseph's Chapel 

Saint Joseph's Chapel to the right of the main sanctuary shows a similar artistic finish in mosaics and marbles to the Lady Chapel. The altar is mainly in Carrara marble relieved by columns in Sienna and Porta Santa. A gilt door, centred by red onyx columns encloses the tabernacle over which stands a marble statue of St. Joseph. In the Marble reredos to the left, is a panel showing the espousal  of St. Joseph to the Virgin Mary, and on the right a similar panel depicting the Holy Family in their Nazareth workshop. The Sanctuary wall carries a number of invocations to St. Joseph set in gold mosaics. The stained glass window over the altar shows the figures of St. Joseph and the infant Jesus in the centre panel. St. Patrick and St. Brigid in mosaics appear to the left and the right respectively. The altar in this chapel was the gift of the Holy Family Confraternity in 1908, because of this the Chapel is commonly referred to as the 'Holy Family Chapel'. The sanctuary lamp in front of the altar was presented Mr James Fleming, Newry, in 1925.

The Cathedral Reliquary 

The Cathedral Reliquary contains over 200 Relics of the Saints. it was described in "The Christian Family Magazine" as "Irelands Most Precious Reliquary" this beautiful shrine is exposed for veneration each year during the octave of the Feast of All Saints. in this vast collection may be seen the Relic of the True Cross, two sets of relics belonging to the Apostles and relics of all noted Irish Saints including St. Patrick, St. Brigid, St. Columkille, St. Columbanus, St. Virgilius, St. Gall, St. Laurence O'Toole, St. Oliver Plunket. Many other Saints of the Catholic Church are also included - Popes, Confessors, Martyrs, Pontiffs, Doctors and Holy Women. Some of these are shown in artistic mountings, others are enclosed in handsomely wrought cases or miniature replicas of famous historic shrines. All were collected by Bishop Mulhern who arranged the setting and layout of the reliquary. The handsome folding oak casement of the shrine was designed and executed by Mr J.H. McAteer, Newry. Together with all the relics enclosed, it was presented to the Cathedral in 1925 by Bishop Mulhern on the occasion of its Consecration.

The Cathedral Sacristy 

The Cathedral is graced with three Sacristies. The "Boy's Sacristy" for the use of the Cathedral Altar Servers, the Upper Sacristy (originally known as the "Confraternity Sacristy") for the use of the two Confraternities that were formerly attached to the Cathedral and the most ornate of the three is the Main Sacristy known as the "Canon's Sacristy". The approach to the Sacristy is through a massive oak-framed and sheeted door. In the Sacristy vestibule on the left-hand side are doors, one leading to stairs by which the confraternity sacristy is reached, and the other to the Main Sacristy. The Sacristy building is separated from the cathedral building by the processional corridor. The Main (Canon's) Sacristy ceiling and walls are wainscoted in framed, panelled and moulded Austrian oak, with sunk recesses for presses, marble lavabo Sacrarium Sink, prie-dieu's for prayers before & after mass and vesting presses. Often refereed to as one of the finest pieces of joinery in the country. Through a doorway at the end of the passage the Lady Chapel is reached.On Sunday 18th January 1959 at 3.00am the Canon's sacristy suffered a devastating fire when the heating chamber below caused the wooden floor joists to combust. The Ceiling was destroyed entirely along with the outer wall section, the gothic chandelier and the fireplace. The upper sacristy at the time was used to store hundreds of candles which fed the flames, as the heat melted the wax it fed the flames in the main sacristy below. The fire service arrived to extinguish the blaze; water was needed from the canal to assist in reducing the flames. As a result the marble was permanently dulled from the oils in the canal water. The priests joined the neighbours that lived in the vicinity, the Cathedral Sacristan and the firemen in tackling the blaze; and due to the structural layout that separates the sacristy building from the church were successful in restricting the damage to the Sacristy building.      

Mass was celebrated as normal that day. A temporary sacristy was erected at the Lady Chapel with vestments borrowed from the Diocesan College and the local Convents.       

Felix O'Hare was appointed to restore the two sacristies. Glass was used to clean the surviving wood and was thereafter waxed. The fire left a lasting change on the patina of the wood resulting in the sacristy to appear as a golden oak colour rather than the original darker finish; the difference can still be seen between the inner and outer sides of the door frames. The latter retains the darker finish. The fireplace was also was replaced with a large mirror. The Cathedral retains a Solemn High Mass Set in Cloth of Gold that still retain the smell of smoke from the fire.

Cathedral Sacristans 
The following people have served as Sacristans of the cathedral;

 Mr Michael Matthews
 Mr Peter Sloan
 Mr Gerry Loughran †
 Mr P.J Shevlin †
 Mr Louis Spencer (who presently serves as Assistant Sacristan)
 Mr Alex McKinley †
 Mr Matthew McCaffery †
 Mr John Bell †
 Mr Eamon Bourke †

The Cathedral Organ 
The present organ is located above the vestibule at the Great West Door. it was built by Messrs. Telford & Telford of Dublin in 1910. This tubular, pneumatic, triple-manual organ was the gift of the people of the Diocese following the completion of the Cathedral in 1909. Half the cost, however, was obtained by the Carnegie grants by Canon O'Hare, P.P., Banbridge, during his U.S.A. campaign for funds towards the Cathedral. Originally the organ was arranged along the back of the choir gallery, but shortly after the arrival of Mons. Jozef Delafaille, L.L.I., as organist in 1929, the organ was re-built and electrified: the pipes were redistributed on either side, thus leaving more space in the gallery and at the same time brightening up the rear of the church by making visible from the interior the large window in the Cathedral façade. Due to this there is an extensive amount of mosaic on the walls in the organ gallery that is now hidden behind the organ.

Specification 
Positive: Trumpetta Real 8, Krummhorn 8, Cymbel RKS 29.33.36, Larigot 1 1/3, Gemshorn 2, Koppel Flute 4, Stopped Diapason 8, Swell to Positive, Positive to Pedal.

Great: Trumpet 8, Sharp Mixture RKS 26.29.33, Full Mixture RKS 15.19.22.26, Sesqui Altera RKS 17.19, Fifteenth 2, Spitz Flute 4, Octave 4, Stopped Diapason 8, Principal 8, Bourdon 16, Swell to Great, Positive to Great, Great to Pedal, SW. & PED Pistons Coupled, GT. & PED Pistons Coupled.

Swell: Swell Octave, Clarion 4, Oboe 8, Trumpet 8, Contra Posaune 16, Mixture RKS 22.26.29, Tierce 1 3/3, Block Flute 2, Nazard 2 2/3, Flute 4, Principal 4, Gedackt 8, Dulciana 8, Swell to Pedal. 

Pedal: Dulzian 4, Trumpet 8, Bombard 16, Mixture RKS 22.26.29.33, Octave Flute 4, Fifteenth 4, Bass Flute 8, Octave 8, Bourdon 16, Principal 16.

Organists 
As of 2023 the Cathedral is without an organist.

Previous organists in the Cathedral include;

 Mr Boyle
 Mr William Callcott McLoughlin
 Mr Hagarty
 Mr John Russell
 Mr M.J Keogh
 Mr Valentine Caulfield
 Mr John Moore
 Mr W.J Monypenny
 Master John O'Beirne
 Mr T. Lynch
 Mr Gus Toremans 
 Mr Josef Delafaill
 Reverend Father Seamus Moore
 Mr Terry Rafferty 
 Mrs Florence McMahon

Anniversaries of significance to the Diocese 

 March 17 - Solemnity of Saint Patrick, Patronal Feast of the Cathedral
 June 7 - Solemnity of Saint Patrick, Patronal Feast of both the Diocese and the Cathedral
 July 21 - Anniversary of the Consecration of the Cathedral 
 In 2029 the Cathedral will celebrate its 200th Bicentenary

Cathedral Clergy 
As of September 2022, Newry Cathedral is served by the following clergy:

Parish priest – Apostolic Administrator of Dromore, Most Reverend Eamon Martin

Administrator – Canon Francis Brown

Curates – Fr Alphonsus Chukwunenye msp. Fr Callum Young. Fr Wojciech Stachyra SChr.

Deacon - Reverend Carlos Esteban Rojo

Liturgy in the Cathedral 

Mass is celebrated every day in the cathedral:

 Sunday Masses are: Vigil (Saturday) 6.00pm; 9am, 1030am (Polish), 12am & 5.30pm.
 Weekday Masses are at 10.30am.

Other sacraments and liturgies:

 Confessions are at 11.00am -12.00pm on Saturdays in the Lady Chapel or in the Bishop's Confessional Box (beside the statue of St Patrick).
 Adoration of the Most Blessed Sacrament takes place Monday – Friday from 9.00am – 10.30am. Saturday from 11.00am – 5.30pm. Sundays from 13.00pm – 5.00pm.
 The Rosary is recited Monday - Friday at 10am. On Saturdays the Rosary is recited at 10am and 3pm.
 As the diocesan Cathedral, it hosts major celebrations in the local Church calendar such as the Chrism Mass on Holy Thursday.

Lying in State 
The following Bishops have Lay in state before the High Altar of the Cathedral;

 Most Reverend Dr Eugene O'Doherty (23-24 March 1979)
 Most Reverend Dr Edward Mulhern (16-17 August 1943)
 Most Reverend Dr Henry O'Neill (14-13 October 1915)
 Most Reverend Dr Thomas McGivern (26-27 November 1900)

Past Administrators 

 Fr Thomas Cranny –? - 1793
 Fr Patrick MacCartan -? – 1877
 Fr Michael McConville – 1887 – 1888
 Fr Thomas Gallery – 1888 – 1891
 Fr James Carlin – 1891 – 1906
 Fr John Rooney – 1906 – 1907
 Fr Joseph Doyle – 1907 – 1914
 Fr Daniel Grant – 1914 – 1923
 Fr Francis J O’Hare – 1923 – 1923
 Fr James Fitzpatrick – 1923 – 1932
 Fr John Magee – 1932 – 1934
 Fr Edward James MacAteer – 1934 – 1937
 Fr Patrick Francis MacComiskey – 1937 – 1950
 Fr Edward Campbell – 1950 – 1955
 Fr James Boyd – 1955 – 1957
 Fr James Burke – 1957 – 1960
 Fr Hugh Esler – 1960 – 1961
 Fr Jack Lynch 1961 – 1970
 Dean Edward Hamill – 1971 – 1981
 Monsignor Arthur Byrne – 1981 – 1987
 Monsignor Arthur Bradley – 1987 – 1992
 Canon John Kearney – 1992 – 1998
 Monsignor Aidan Hamill 1998 – 2003
 Fr Terence Rafferty – 2003 – 2010
 Canon Francis Brown – 2010 – Present

Gallery

See also 
List of cathedrals in Ireland

References

External links

This article incorporates text from the entry "Diocese of Dromore" in the public-domain Catholic Encyclopedia of 1909.
 Dromore Cathedral homepage

Roman Catholic churches completed in 1829
19th-century Roman Catholic church buildings in the United Kingdom
Roman Catholic Diocese of Dromore
Roman Catholic cathedrals in Northern Ireland
Newry
Churches in County Down
Grade A listed buildings
Gothic Revival church buildings in Northern Ireland
19th-century churches in Northern Ireland